The women's 4 kilometres team pursuit competition at the 2014 Asian Games was held on 21 and 22 September at the Incheon International Velodrome.

Schedule
All times are Korea Standard Time (UTC+09:00)

Records

Results

Qualifying

First round

Heat 1

Heat 2

Heat 3

Summary

Finals

Bronze

Gold

References 
Results

External links 
 

Track Women team pursuit